Krylya may refer to:

 Wings (Kuzmin novel), a 1906 Russian novel by Mikhail Kuzmin
 Krylya (album), a 2005 album by Catharsis
 Krylya (Wings), Russia's winning entry in the 2017 Junior Eurovision Song Contest